Even Dogs in the Wild is the twentieth instalment in the bestselling Inspector Rebus series of crime novels, published in 2015. The novel takes its name from the song of the same name by the Scottish band The Associates from their album The Affectionate Punch.

Plot summary 
A former Scottish senior prosecutor has been found dead, with a threatening note in his pocket. Siobhan Clarke is in charge of the high-profile case. Then the semi-retired gangster 'Big Ger' Cafferty receives a similar note and someone shoots at him. John Rebus has retired (for the second time), but he is asked to join in the investigation. Meanwhile Malcolm Fox is drafted into a surveillance team monitoring a group of Glaswegian gangsters who look set to move on Edinburgh. Cafferty, the young Edinburgh gangster Darryl Christie, and the Glasgow gang are all looking over their shoulders at each other and at the police. Cafferty is the one who recognizes the history behind the vendetta against him and a few other survivors of a disastrous event thirty years earlier.

References

2015 British novels
Inspector Rebus novels
Orion Books books